Paul Abasolo Amantegi (born 29 June 1984) is a Spanish footballer who plays as a forward.

Club career
Born in Durango, Biscay, Abasolo spent seven years connected with Athletic Bilbao, six in the youth system and one with the farm team, CD Basconia. Released in 2003, he played the better part of the following six years in the third division and in his native Basque Country, the sole exception being SD Eibar in the first part of the 2004–05 season in the second level, with that club loaning him consecutively to two other teams in division three, SD Lemona and Logroñés CF.

In the 2009–10 campaign, Abasolo competed for the second time in the second tier of Spanish football, scoring four goals in 34 games for Real Unión as they suffered relegation one year after being promoted. After a few months playing with a regional league side, he resumed his career in the third division with Lemona, Real Oviedo and Sestao River Club.

Conviction
Convicted of sexual assault in July 2010 for having attacked three young women – he was acquitted on a fourth charge due to doubts of the alleged victim. Abasolo was eventually pardoned by the Government of Spain, but this fact prevented him from being hired by his former club Athletic Bilbao.

References

External links

1984 births
Living people
People from Durango, Biscay
Spanish footballers
Footballers from the Basque Country (autonomous community)
Association football forwards
Segunda División players
Segunda División B players
Tercera División players
CD Basconia footballers
Barakaldo CF footballers
SD Eibar footballers
SD Lemona footballers
Logroñés CF footballers
Real Unión footballers
Real Oviedo players
Sestao River footballers
Zamudio SD players
People convicted of sexual assault
Club Portugalete players
Athletic Bilbao footballers
Sportspeople from Biscay